John Dailey may refer to:

 John Dailey (baseball) (1853–?), American baseball player
 John Dailey (politician) (1867–1929), American politician from Illinois
 John R. Dailey (born 1934), United States Marine Corps general
 John E. Dailey (born 1972), mayor-elect of Tallahassee, Florida

See also
 John Daly (disambiguation)